Hubert-Charron Cabana (14 June 1838 – 9 June 1901) was a Canadian lawyer, journalist, politician, and office holder.

Born in Verchères, Lower Canada, Cabana was one of the first French-Canadian lawyers in  Sherbrooke. He founded the first French-language newspaper in that city, called Le Pionnier de Sherbrooke, and became its first francophone mayor.

He was appointed consulting counsel on 26 June 1883 and elected Bâtonnierof Saint-François district in May 1884.

He died in Sherbrooke on June 9, 1901.

References 

 

Francophone Quebec people
1838 births
1901 deaths
Lawyers in Quebec
People from Verchères, Quebec